Celebrity Bluff is a Philippine television comedy game show broadcast by GMA Network. Hosted by Eugene Domingo, it premiered on November 17, 2012. The show originally featured Jose Manalo and Wally Bayola as the original "Gangnammms" (also known as "Celebrity Bluffers"), which later consisted of Celebrity Bluffers, Boobay and Brod Pete. The show concluded on June 30, 2018, with a total of 213 episodes. It was replaced by The Clash in its timeslot.

Overview
In September 2013, Bayola left the show after facing a scandal. He was then replaced by Boobay and Brod Pete who later became regular cast members.

In November 2015, Manalo decided not to renew his contract due to scheduling conflict, at the same time Salvador also left the show before the season ended. The two were replaced by several guests such as Betong Sumaya, Boobsie, Jerald Napoles, Ai Ai delas Alas and Pauleen Luna among others.

On February 4, 2016, the director of the show, Uro dela Cruz, died at the age of 64. The show went on a break after on February 20, 2016, it was replaced by Lip Sync Battle Philippines. The show returned on June 3, 2017, replacing Full House Tonight.

Gameplay
Three contestants or couples attempt to outwit one another by answering questions to advance to the succeeding rounds.

In round one called Fact or Bluff, three players individually answer questions. The celebrity bluffers also referred to as gangnammmm will either help or trick the players by providing answers to the questions. The players have to decide whether their chosen bluffer's answer is a fact or a bluff. If answered correctly, the players get to keep the cash prize for that question otherwise the cash prize will be split between the opponents.

In round two "Word War", with the help of the clues given by the bluffer, the players will then race to solve each three word puzzles to advance to the final round. The first word is worth ₱5,000, the second word is ₱7,000 and the last word is ₱9,000. The player with the highest accumulated points moves on to the final round

In its 12 season, they introduced a new segment, "Tough 10" on which the players should answer 10 questions only using Fact or Bluff. At the end, you should have at least 8 correct answers to proceed to win ₱500,000.

Cast

Host
 Eugene Domingo 

Bluffers
 Wally Bayola 
 Jose Manalo 
 Boobay 
 Brod Pete 
 Edu Manzano 

Recurring guests 
 Boobsie Wonderland 
 Donita Nose 
 Super Tekla 
 Jay Arcilla 
 Dave Bornea 
 Prince Clemente 
 Jomarie Nielsen 
 Nikki Co 
 Arjan Jimenez 
 Yasser Marta 
 Kevin Sagra 
 Ralf King

Ratings
According to AGB Nielsen Philippines' Mega Manila household television ratings, the pilot episode of Celebrity Bluff earned a 16.5% rating.

Accolades

References

External links
 
 

2012 Philippine television series debuts
2018 Philippine television series endings
Filipino-language television shows
GMA Network original programming
Philippine game shows